Deh Cheshmeh (also Romanized as Dah Cheshmeh) is a village in Mizdej-e Olya Rural District of the Central District of Farsan County, Chaharmahal and Bakhtiari province, Iran. At the 2006 census, its population was 4,699 in 989 households. The following census in 2011 counted 4,795 people in 1,225 households. The latest census in 2016 showed a population of 4,510 people in 1,229 households; it was the largest village in its rural district. The village is populated by Lurs.

See also 
 Tappe Bardnakoon

References 

Farsan County

Populated places in Chaharmahal and Bakhtiari Province

Populated places in Farsan County

Luri settlements in Chaharmahal and Bakhtiari Province